The St. Louis Literary Award has been presented yearly since 1967 to a distinguished figure in literature. It is sponsored by the Saint Louis University Library Associates.

Winners

Past Recipients of the Award:

2023 Neil Gaiman
2022   Arundhati Roy
2021   Zadie Smith
2020   Michael Chabon
2019   Edwidge Danticat
2018   Stephen Sondheim
2017   Margaret Atwood
2016   Michael Ondaatje
2015   David Grossman
2014   Jeanette Winterson
2013   [no award]
2012   Tony Kushner
2011   Mario Vargas Llosa
2010   Don DeLillo
2009   Sir Salman Rushdie
2008	E. L. Doctorow
2007	William H. Gass
2006	Michael Frayn
2005   Richard Ford
2004	Garry Wills
2003   Margaret Drabble
2002   Joan Didion
2001	Simon Schama
2000   N. Scott Momaday
1999   Chinua Achebe
1998   Seamus Heaney
1997   Stephen E. Ambrose
1996   Antonia Fraser
1995	Edward Albee
1994   Stephen Jay Gould
1993	David McCullough
1992   Shelby Foote
1991   August Wilson
1990   Tom Wolfe
1989   Richard Wilbur
1988   Joyce Carol Oates
1987 	John Updike
1986   Saul Bellow
1985   Walker Percy
1984	[no award]
1983   Eudora Welty
1982   William Styron
1981   James A. Michener
1980	Arthur Miller
1979   Howard Nemerov
1978   Mortimer J. Adler
1977   Robert Penn Warren
1976 	R. Buckminster Fuller
1975   John Hope Franklin
1974   Tennessee Williams
1973   James T. Farrell
1972   Francis Warner
1971	Barbara Tuchman
1970	W. H. Auden
1969 	George Plimpton
1968 	Jacques Barzun
1967	Henry Steele Commager

References

External links 
Library Associates Website

Saint Louis University
Awards established in 1967
1967 establishments in Missouri
American fiction awards